Akron is a city in the U.S. state of Ohio.

Akron may also refer to:

Aviation
 USS Akron, a rigid airship of the United States Navy
 Akron (1911 airship), a semirigid airship that exploded in 1912

Entertainment
 Akron (film), a 2015 independent, LGBT-themed film, directed by Brian O'Donnell
 Akron / Family, a folk-influenced experimental rock band

Places

Canada
 Akron, Ontario

United States
 Akron, Alabama
 Akron, Colorado
 Akron, Indiana
 Akron, Iowa
 Akron, Kansas
 Akron, Michigan
 Akron, Missouri
 Akron, Nebraska
 Akron, New York
 Akron, Ohio
 Akron, Pennsylvania
 Akron, West Virginia
 Akron Township, Illinois
 Akron Township, Michigan
 Akron Township, Big Stone County, Minnesota
 Akron Township, Wilkin County, Minnesota

Other uses
 University of Akron, in Ohio
 Akron and Barberton Belt Railroad
 Akron Plan, an architectural plan for church buildings in the late 19th and early 20th century
 Acron Group, sometimes spelled Akron Group, a Russian chemical company
 Independence Akron, a German paraglider design
 The Akron (1948–1985), a Southern California-based imported goods and home decorating retail chain
 Akron / Family, American experimental folk group
 Akron Stadium, a football stadium in Guadalajara, Mexico
 FC Akron Tolyatti, a Russian professional football club based in Tolyatti

See also
 Acron (disambiguation)
 Akron Airport (disambiguation)